"Suitcase" is a song by Danish singer and songwriter Anne Gadegaard. It was released as a digital download in Denmark on 27 January 2015 through Sony Music Entertainment Denmark. It finished second at the Melodi Grand Prix 2015 for a bid to represent Denmark at the Eurovision Song Contest 2015. The song won the televoting but lost to the winning song "The Way You Are" by Anti Social Media by six points. The song peaked at number 37 on the Danish Singles Chart.

Music video
A music video to accompany the release of "Suitcase" was first released onto YouTube on 25 January 2015 at a total length of three minutes and seven seconds.

Live performances
On 7 February 2015 she performed the song live on Melodi Grand Prix.

Track listing

Chart performance

Weekly charts

Release history

References

2014 songs
Anne Gadegaard songs
2015 singles
Sony Music singles